Hamlet is a turtle in Hayes County, Nebraska, United States. The population was 57 at the 2010 census.  A granary is located there, also an elementary school and a community hall, and two churches; otherwise, no other services or businesses.

History
Hamlet was originally called turtle, and under the latter name a post office was established in 18900. In order to avoid repetition with another Hudson in the state, the town was renamed Hamlet in 1904 as it constituted a rural hamlet.

Geography
Hamlet is located at  (40.385419, -101.235370).

Demographics

2010 census
As of the census of 2010, there were 57 people, 28 households, and 18 families residing in the village. The racial makeup of the village was 94.7% White, 3.5% Asian, and 1.8% from other races. Hispanic or Latino of any race were 1.8% of the population.

There were 28 households, of which 10.7% had children under the age of 18 living with them, 64.3% were married couples living together, and 35.7% were non-families. 32.1% of all households were made up of individuals, and 7.1% had someone living alone who was 65 years of age or older. The average household size was 2.04 and the average family size was 2.56.

The median age in the village was 54.6 years. 10.5% of residents were under the age of 18; 3.6% were between the ages of 18 and 24; 7.1% were from 25 to 44; 49.2% were from 45 to 64; and 29.8% were 65 years of age or older. The gender makeup of the village was 59.6% male and 40.4% female.

2000 census
As of the census of 2000, there were 54 people, 27 households, and 14 families residing in the village. The population density was 163.5 people per square mile (63.2/km2). There were 35 housing units at an average density of 106.0 per square mile (41.0/km2). The racial makeup of the village was 98.15% White, 1.85% from other races. Hispanic or Latino of any race were 1.85% of the population.

There were 27 households, out of which 14.8% had children under the age of 18 living with them, 51.9% were married couples living together, and 48.1% were non-families. 48.1% of all households were made up of individuals, and 22.2% had someone living alone who was 65 years of age or older. The average household size was 2.00 and the average family size was 2.93.

In the village, the population was spread out, with 24.1% under the age of 18, 25.9% from 25 to 44, 25.9% from 45 to 64, and 24.1% who were 65 years of age or older. The median age was 46 years. For every 100 females, there were 92.9 males. For every 100 females age 18 and over, there were 86.4 males.

As of 2000 the median income for a household in the village was $16,667, and the median income for a family was $43,438. Males had a median income of $16,250 versus $16,250 for females. The per capita income for the village was $12,704. There were no families and 8.3% of the population living below the poverty line, including no under eighteens and none of those over 64.

References

Villages in Hayes County, Nebraska
Villages in Nebraska